Rogisvaldo João dos Santos (born 12 October 1987), known as Nem, is a Brazilian professional footballer who plays as a defensive midfielder for Brazilian club Brasil de Pelotas in Campeonato Brasileiro Série B.

Career
Nem born in São Bernardo do Campo. Revealed by São Bernardo in 2007. In 2010, he was hired by Red Bull Brasil and in 2011, agreed with Juventus.

Juventude
In 2012, the steering wheel was hired by Juventude, where he helped the team win the Copa FGF.

Figueirense
In 2013, he signed Figueirense for 1 year, and in 2014, renewed his contract and helped Figueira win their 16th title Campeonato Catarinense.

ABC
In 2015, it was announced as ABC reinforcement. He scored his first goal for the club in alvinegro win 2–0 on Boavista in a match valid for the Copa do Brasil.

Ceará
On 28 March 2016, it was not borrowed by the end of November to the Ceará. After receiving proposals from other clubs, nor was returned to Figueirense after rapid loan period.

Brasil de Pelotas
In May 2016, he was loaned to the end of the Campeonato Brasileiro Série B of 2016 to Brasil de Pelotas.

Honours

Juventude
 Copa FGF: 2012

Figueirense
 Campeonato Catarinense: 2014

ABC
 Copa RN: 2015

References

1987 births
Living people
Footballers from São Paulo (state)
Brazilian footballers
Association football midfielders
São Bernardo Futebol Clube players
Red Bull Brasil players
Clube Atlético Juventus players
Esporte Clube Juventude players
Figueirense FC players
ABC Futebol Clube players
Ceará Sporting Club players
Grêmio Esportivo Brasil players
Campeonato Brasileiro Série A players
Campeonato Brasileiro Série B players
Campeonato Brasileiro Série D players